Pieter ("Piet") Norval (born 7 April 1970) is a former tennis player from South Africa, who turned professional in 1988. His most notable achievement was winning the mixed doubles at the French Open in 1999. The right-hander represented his native country in the doubles competition at the 1992 Summer Olympics in Barcelona, where he partnered Wayne Ferreira. The pair won the silver medal, after losing the final to Boris Becker and Michael Stich from Germany. Norval reached his highest singles ATP-ranking on 19 June 1989, when he became the no. 125 of the world.

Retirement
After retiring in 2001 from professional tennis, Norval set up and currently runs a tennis academy in Hartbeespoort.

Major finals

Olympic finals

Doubles: 1 (1 silver medal)

Year-end championships finals

Doubles: 1 (1–0)

Career finals

Doubles: 35 (14–21)

Doubles performance timeline

References

External links
 
 
 

1970 births
Living people
Afrikaner people
South African male tennis players
Tennis players at the 1992 Summer Olympics
Olympic tennis players of South Africa
Olympic silver medalists for South Africa
Olympic medalists in tennis
Grand Slam (tennis) champions in mixed doubles
Medalists at the 1992 Summer Olympics
French Open champions